Reborn is the sixth studio album by American rock band Trapt, released on January 22, 2013. It is their first album released through Epochal Artists Records and EMI Records. The album was produced by lead vocalist Chris Taylor Brown and co-produced, engineered, and mixed by Matt Thorne, who produced the band's live album Trapt Live! and compilation album Headstrong. This is the band's first album released independently and is also their first and only album with drummer Dylan Howard after previous drummer Aaron "Monty" Montgomery left in 2012. This is also their last album with guitarist Robb Torres before he would leave the band. 
The first single, "Bring It", was released on December 7, 2012. A second single titled "Love Hate Relationship'" was released on iTunes on October 2, 2013, along with a remastered version of "Bring It". A third single, "Living in the Eye of the Storm" was released in February 2014 with a music video paying tribute to US soldiers.

Background

In regards to the album's sound, singer Chris Taylor Brown states: “This record is really a new sound for Trapt. With ‘Reborn’ we really wanted to use new sounds and textures as well as experiment with delays, reverbs, synths and many other techniques we have learned over the years or have heard in our influences. Lyrically, this album is as deep and thoughtful as any album that Trapt has done in the past.”

In March 2012, the band began streaming weekly videos dubbed "March Riffness", where both Brown and guitarist Robb Torres played sneak peeks of the album's guitar riffs.

In August 2012, as a special thanks to the fans supporting the single "Bring It", the band released for a limited time a medley of "Love Hate Relationship" and "Experience". In September 2012, a second medley was released, this time featuring "Love Hate Relationship" with "Livewire".

Reborn was released in two versions in January 2013, standard edition with 11 tracks and the deluxe edition with 17 total tracks with never-before released fan-favorite Avelyn.

A total of three singles have been released as of February 2013, "Bring It", "Love Hate Relationship" and "Living in the Eye of the Storm" with music videos for each.

The album received mostly positive reviews from most critics.

Reborn, is Trapt's fifth album to crack the Billboard top 50. It peaked at number 44, selling  8,700 copies in its first week.

Track listing

Deluxe edition

Personnel
Chris Taylor Brown – lead vocals, rhythm guitar
Robb Torres – lead guitar
Pete Charell – bass
Dylan Howard – drums

References

Trapt albums
2013 albums